Islam in Cape Verde is a minority religion with a small but growing community. Most Muslims are immigrants from Senegal and other neighboring countries, and are active in small-scale commerce and souvenir trade.

See also
 Religion in Cape Verde

References

Cape Verde
Religion in Cape Verde